Cragston Dependencies is a group of historic buildings located at Highlands in Orange County, New York. They were built about 1860 as part of the Cragston estate of J. P. Morgan (1837–1913).  They consist of a house, barn, well, carriage house, and stable in the Carpenter Gothic style.

It was listed on the National Register of Historic Places in 1982.

References

Houses on the National Register of Historic Places in New York (state)
Carpenter Gothic houses in New York (state)
Houses completed in 1860
Houses in Orange County, New York
National Register of Historic Places in Orange County, New York